Tiny Desk Concerts is a video series of live concerts hosted by NPR Music at the desk of All Songs Considered host Bob Boilen in Washington, D.C.

The first Tiny Desk Concert came about in 2008 after Boilen and NPR Music editor Stephen Thompson left South by Southwest frustrated that they couldn't hear the music over the crowd noise. Thompson joked that the musician, folk singer Laura Gibson, should just perform at Boilen's desk. A month later Boilen arranged for her to do just that, making an impromptu recording and posting it online. The name is taken from Boilen's 1970s psychedelic dance band called Tiny Desk Unit.

The series has previously drawn criticism for narrowness in the musical genres it includes—described as focused on "hipster-infused indie rock" by Zachary Crockett at Vox—to the exclusion of genres like country and hip-hop. However, the series' musical focus has broadened in scope over time.

During the COVID-19 pandemic, NPR Music enlisted artists to instead record their own virtual performances under the re-branded title Tiny Desk (Home) Concerts. The 2022 Tiny Desk Concert winner, Alisa Amador, was the first performance back at the desk with an audience since the pandemic started.

, the series included more than 800 concerts viewed a collective 2 billion times on YouTube.

Tiny Desk Contest
In December 2014, NPR announced it would host its first contest, inviting musicians to submit a video of one of their songs. A jury of musicians and NPR staff choose a winner to play a Tiny Desk Concert. The contest has continued annually, each year drawing more than 6000 submissions. Jurors have included Trey Anastasio of Phish, Dan Auerbach of the Black Keys, and Jess Wolfe of Lucius.

Tiny Desk Contest winners have included: 

 Fantastic Negrito (2015) 
 Gaelynn Lea (2016) 
 Tank and the Bangas (2017) 
 Naia Izumi (2018)
 Quinn Christopherson (2019) 
 Linda Diaz (2020)
 Neffy (2021)
 Alisa Amador (2022)

Concerts by year

2008

2009

2010

2011

2012

2013

2014

2015

2016

2017

2018

2019

2020

2021

2022

2023

References

External links
 Tiny Desk Concerts at NPR

American music websites
NPR
2008 introductions